The director of finance of the Falkland Islands is the government officer responsible for economic and financial matters in the Falkland Islands. The role and powers of the director of finance are set out in Chapter VI of the Falkland Islands Constitution. The position replaced the office of financial secretary in 2009 when the new Constitution came into effect.

The director of finance is an ex officio member of the Legislative Assembly and the Executive Council, and also acts as Stanley's returning officer during general and by-elections in the absence of the chief executive. The director of finance is not permitted to be a member of the Public Accounts Committee.

The current director of finance is James Wilson, who took up office in 2017.

References

 
 
 

 
Falkland Islands
Politics of the Falkland Islands